The 2018–19 Wichita State Shockers men's basketball team represented Wichita State University in the 2018–19 NCAA Division I men's basketball season. They played their home games at Charles Koch Arena in Wichita, Kansas and were led by 12th-year head coach Gregg Marshall as members of the American Athletic Conference. Samajae Haynes-Jones and Dexter Dennis have, in total, three notable buzzer-beaters at SMU, UConn and Tulane. This season was the first time not making the NCAA field of 68 since the 2010–11 season. They finished the season 22–15 overall, 10–8 in AAC play to finish in sixth place. As a No. 6 seed in the AAC tournament, they advanced to the semifinals, where they were defeated by Cincinnati.

With a 19–14 record, they were awarded an at-large bid to the NIT tournament. As a No. 6 seed, they were winners of the Indiana bracket when they defeated No. 3 seed Furman in the first round, No. 2 seed Clemson in the second round, and No. 1 seed Indiana in the quarterfinals. In the semifinal matchup at Madison Square Garden, they were defeated by the winners of the UNC Greensboro bracket, Lipscomb, 64–71.

Previous season
The Shockers finished the 2017–18 season 25–8, 14–4 in AAC play to finish a tie for second place. As the No. 2 seed in the AAC tournament, they defeated Temple in the quarterfinals before losing to Houston in the semifinals. They received an at-large bid to the NCAA tournament for the seventh straight season. As the No. 4 seed in the East region, they were upset in the first round by Marshall.

Offseason

Departures

In addition to the departing players, two of the three assistants in the 2017–18 season left during the offseason. Kyle Lindsted left after three seasons on the Shockers' staff to take the same position at Minnesota under Richard Pitino. Donnie Jones left after one season to join the Dayton staff under Anthony Grant, who had been his colleague from 1996 to 2006 as part of Billy Donovan's staff at Florida.

2018 recruiting class

Incoming transfers

Roster 

Dec. 17th, 2018 - Chance Moore elected to transfer to Washington State after the fall semester.

Schedule and results

|-
!colspan=12 style=| Exhibition

|-
!colspan=12 style=| Non-conference regular season

|-
!colspan=9 style=| American Conference regular season

|-
!colspan=12 style=| American Conference tournament
|-

|-
|-
!colspan=12 style=| NIT
|-

Source

References

Wichita State Shockers men's basketball seasons
Wichita State
Shock
Wichita State